Lourdes Alonso Flores (born 2 October 1958) is a Mexican politician affiliated with the Party of the Democratic Revolution. As of 2014 she served as Deputy of the LX Legislature of the Mexican Congress representing the Federal District.

References

1958 births
Living people
Politicians from Michoacán
Women members of the Chamber of Deputies (Mexico)
Members of the Chamber of Deputies (Mexico) for Mexico City
Party of the Democratic Revolution politicians
21st-century Mexican politicians
21st-century Mexican women politicians
Members of the Congress of Mexico City
Deputies of the LX Legislature of Mexico